Iosif Anisim is a Romanian sprint canoer who competed in the late 1990s and early 2000s. He won a complete set of medals at the ICF Canoe Sprint World Championships with a gold (C-4 500 m: 2001), a silver (C-4 1000 m: 1999), and a bronze (C-4 1000 m: 2001).

References

Living people
Romanian male canoeists
Year of birth missing (living people)
ICF Canoe Sprint World Championships medalists in Canadian